APSAT may refer to:
 Adenylylsulfate—ammonia adenylyltransferase, an enzyme
 Apsat (river), a tributary of the Chara in Zabaykalsky Krai, Russia
 Apsat (mythology), a male deity of birds and animals in the pagan Svan mythology